Greg Beumer (born July 10, 1954) is an American politician who served in the Indiana House of Representatives from the 33rd district from 2013 to 2018.

References

1954 births
Living people
Republican Party members of the Indiana House of Representatives
21st-century American politicians